Stechkin is a surname. Notable people with the surname include:

 Boris Stechkin (1891–1969), Russian scientist, inventor, and engineer
 Igor Stechkin, Russian small arms designer
 Sergey Stechkin, Soviet mathematician

See also
 The Stechkin APS pistol

Russian-language surnames